The year 663 BC was a year of the pre-Julian Roman calendar. In the Roman Empire, it was known as year 91 Ab urbe condita . The denomination 663 BC for this year has been used since the early medieval period, when the Anno Domini calendar era became the prevalent method in Europe for naming years.

Events
 The Assyrian Empire under Ashurbanipal drives the Kushites from Egypt and conquers the country.

Births

Deaths

References